Tyler Shandro  (born ) is a Canadian politician who has served as the minister of justice and solicitor general of Alberta since February 25, 2022. A member of the United Conservative Party (UCP), Shandro was elected to represent Calgary-Acadia in the Legislative Assembly of Alberta in the 2019 provincial election. He was Alberta's minister of health from 2019 to 2021, and minister of labour and immigration from 2021 until he was named justice minister in 2022.

Early and personal life
Tyler Shandro was born in Edmonton, Alberta, and later moved to Calgary to attend the University of Calgary and begin his legal career. During his legal career he served as a member of several boards, including the Criminal Injuries Review Board, the National Parole Board, and the Municipal Government Board. Shandro also served on the Calgary Police Commission. Previously he was appointed as a member of the Disaster Advisory Committee after the 2013 Alberta floods.

Family 
Shandro is married to Andrea and they have two children. His great-uncle Andrew Shandro served as a Member of the Legislative Assembly (MLA) for the Whitford electoral district from 1913 to 1922 representing the Liberal Party of Alberta. The hamlet of Shandro, Alberta in Two Hills County is named in honour of Shandro's ancestors.

Political career (2019–present)

Early political involvement 
Shandro was a long time volunteer with the Progressive Conservative (PC) Association of Alberta. Following the party's defeat in the 2015 Alberta general election, Shandro ran unsuccessfully for party president against Katherine O'Neill. During this time Shandro rejected calls to merge the PCs with the Wildrose Party, calling the idea "insulting to most of our members". Following Jason Kenney's entrance into provincial politics, Shandro supported the amalgamation, and wrote one of the legal briefs arguing the amalgamation was legally possible. Shandro served on the committee which set out the terms forming the UCP following the 2017 merger of the PCs and Wildrose Party.

Election to Legislature (2019) 
Shandro contested the 2019 Alberta general election in the district of Calgary-Acadia which was previously held by New Democratic Party (NDP) MLA Brandy Payne, who retired from politics following the closure of the 29th Alberta Legislature. Shandro captured 12,615 votes (54 per cent) defeating five other opponents including the next closest candidate, New Democrat Kate Andrews, with 8,049 votes (35 per cent).

Minister of Health (2019–2021) 
On April 30, 2019, Shandro was appointed as the minister of health.

Vital Partners controversy 
On March 19, 2020 concerns were raised on social media that there was a potential conflict of interest on the part of Shandro, who has shares in Vital Partners, along with his wife's sister, and his wife, Andrea Shandro. In response to complaints sent to the ethics commissioner's office about Shandro's alleged conflict of interest, the ethics commissioner, Marguerite Trussler, wrote in a March 20, 2020 letter that, since Shandro was not the director of Shandro Holdings, the company that owns Vital Partners, and since his shares in that company are in a blind trust, he has done "all that is required to be in compliance with the Conflict of Interest Act".

Confrontation with neighbour 
On March 22, Shandro and his wife went to the residence of one of Shandro's neighbours, a Calgary physician (who was at that time also a UCP member). Shandro berated him for posting content regarding Shandro's potential conflict of interest regarding Vital Partners on Facebook. Following the incident, Opposition MLAs called on Premier Kenney to fire Shandro. The neighbour was asked him to remove the post, which he did and later said that he has "forgiven him [Shandro] and his wife" and that "They acted out of character". Shandro responded to the media controversy in a March 27 statement, saying that the social media posts regarding Vital Partners had led to his family being "subjected to an online campaign of defamation". In his March 27 statement he said he regretted his actions because they were a distraction from the COVID-19 pandemic but he refused to publicly apologize to the physician. Shandro was supported by Premier Kenney, who said that Shandro's behaviour was justified given that Shandro felt he was defending his family.

By the end of March, there was considerable media coverage of Shandro's response to these concerns including articles in the Medicine Hat News, the Edmonton Journal, and CBC News, A CBC article described how Vital Partners could potentially profit from changes to provincial physician reimbursement that led to physicians having to fire staff and shutter practices. The media coverage of the confrontation resulted in the political opposition and citizens calling for Shandro's resignation.

Shandro struggled to recover from this incident, with an April poll showing 34 per cent of Albertans expressing their approval for his handling of COVID-19—the lowest approval rating in Canada. In a July 2020 survey of Alberta doctors, 98% of respondents said that they had lost confidence in Shandro.

Further confrontations with constituents 
A March 27 CBC article described another incident in which Shandro allegedly threatened a constituent who had confronted him about the conflict of interest, saying he would send provincial security services after her.

On April 3, the CBC published an article detailing how Shandro had allegedly obtained the personal phone numbers of two physicians from Alberta Health Services illegally. He phoned the two individuals on their private phones, which raised concerns about privacy violations.

AMA agreement 
Bill 21 gave Shandro the right to unilaterally end the long-standing master agreement with the Alberta Medical Association (AMA). He terminated the agreement on March 30 and introduced a new fee structure. On April 9, the AMA filed a lawsuit against the province, citing the termination of  the agreement as well as the "government's conduct during negotiations". On March 30, 2021, Alberta doctors voted down a negotiated offer to settle their long standing dispute with the government. This was due in part to doctors and their mistrust of Shandro from past disputes.

End of tenure 
On September 21, 2021 Premier Jason Kenney shuffled him out of the cabinet position as health minister. NDP leader Rachel Notley stated that the news of his departure was "welcome" however "Alberta is facing a crisis in our hospitals but the UCP can't see beyond the chaotic spectacle of their own infighting."

Minister of Labour and Immigration (2021–2022) 
On September 21, 2021, Shandro was appointed as the minister of labour and immigration, swapping roles with Jason Copping, who took over the health portfolio.

Minister of Justice and Solicitor General of Alberta (2022–present) 
Shandro took over the role of minister of justice and solicitor general of Alberta on February 25, 2022, swapping portfolios with Kaycee Madu, who was demoted after a probe found he attempted to interfere with the administration of justice.

Law Society of Alberta Proceedings 
In 2020, the Law Society of Alberta authorized three citations against Tyler Shandro. Citation CO20200379 states: "It is alleged that Tyler Shandro, KC attended the private residence of a member of the public, behaved inappropriately by engaging in conduct that brings the reputation of the profession into disrepute, and that such conduct is deserving of sanction". Citation CO20200393 states: "It is alleged that Tyler Shandro, KC used his position as Minister of Health to obtain personal cell phone numbers, contacted one or more members of the public outside of regular working hours using that information, and that such conduct is deserving of sanction". And Citation  CO20200759 states: "It is alleged that Tyler Shandro, KC responded to an email from a member of the public addressed to his wife by threatening to refer that individual to the authorities if they did not address future correspondence to his office as Minister of Health, and that such conduct is deserving of sanction."

Virtual conduct hearings into these matters began on Tuesday January 24, 2023. The hearing was adjourned to a later date as the 3 days allotted for the hearing were insufficient.

References

United Conservative Party MLAs
Living people
Politicians from Calgary
Politicians from Edmonton
Members of the Executive Council of Alberta
Health ministers of Alberta
21st-century Canadian politicians
Year of birth uncertain
Canadian people of Ukrainian descent
Year of birth missing (living people)